IFK Uppsala is a Swedish sports club located in Uppsala in Sweden, with several departments:

 IFK Uppsala Fotboll, association football department
 IFK Uppsala Bandy, bandy department

The club was established in 1895. On 30 January 1921, the ice hockey team was involved in the first ice hockey game on Swedish soil, defeating German Berliner SC, 4-1, in front of 2 022 spectators at the Stockholm Olympic Stadium.

References

External links
IFK Uppsala Official website

 
Uppsala, IFK
Uppsala
Uppsala, IFK
Multi-sport clubs in Sweden
Sports clubs established in 1895
1895 establishments in Sweden